Knefastia aenigmatica is an extinct species of sea snail, a marine gastropod mollusc in the family Pseudomelatomidae, the turrids and allies.

Description

Distribution
This extinct marine species was found in lower Miocene strata in Venezuela.

References

External links
 

aenigmatica
Gastropods described in 2016
Miocene gastropods